Buccaneers Rugby Football Club is a rugby union club in Athlone, Ireland.  They compete in Division 1B of the  All-Ireland League. The club's colours are Black and Gold.

Although the club grounds are currently located in Leinster,  it has always competed at underage, junior and senior level leagues in Connacht as Athlone RFC had previously.

History 
The team's name originates from the Shannon Buccaneers club founded by Diarmuid Murtagh from Athlone in the early 1930s. Fielding players such as British and Irish Lions captain Sammy Walker, the club later disbanded due to the Second World War.

More recently, in the 1993/94 season, the Athlone and Ballinasloe amalgamated in order to take part in the All-Ireland League. They were initially known as Athlone-Ballinasloe before changing their name to Buccaneers.

Ballinasloe withdrew from the amalgamation at the end of the 2005/06 season.

Honours
Connacht Senior League: 13
1997-98, 1998-99, 1999-2000, 2003-04, 2005-06, 2006-07, 2007-08, 2010-11, 2015-16, 2016-17, 2017-18, 2018-19, 2022-23
Connacht Senior Cup: 9
1994-95, 1998-99, 1999-2000, 2003-04, 2005-06, 2006-07, 2014-15, 2016-17, 2021-22

Dubarry Park 

As part of a sponsorship deal with footwear brand Dubarry, the Buccaneers sports grounds was renamed Dubarry Park in 2003. It was officially opened by then IRFU President Don Crowley. Dubarry Park is a 10,000 capacity stadium with a state of the art club house and dressing room facilities, and has hosted U-21 and U-20 Irish home games for the Six Nations Championship. From 1998 to 2003 the venue was called Ericsson Park.

Notable players
 Jordan Conroy - plays for the Ireland national rugby sevens team
 Robbie Henshaw - Ireland international
 Jack Carty - Connacht and Ireland International

References 

 Buccaneers RFC

Rugby union clubs in County Westmeath
Rugby clubs established in 1994
Sport in Athlone
Senior Irish rugby clubs (Connacht)
1994 establishments in Ireland